On 21 April 2020 in Baakline, Chouf District, Mount Lebanon Governorate, Lebanon, nine people were killed. Mazen Harfoush is the suspect. His wife is one of those killed.

The killing spree began at 3:30pm, using a knife to kill Harfoush's wife; then eight other people were shot dead. They include Harfoush's brother, Fawzi Harfoush, who was previously suspected of being an accomplice. Six of the victims were Syrian and the other three Lebanese. The attack is the non-conflict attack, and Harfoush was arrested in the evening. The attack is suspected to be an honour killing.  According to military and local municipal police personnel worked together in the search, 
finding it a 20-kilometre perimeter around Baakline village.

References

2020 in Lebanon
2020 mass shootings in Asia

April 2020 crimes in Asia
April 2020 events in Lebanon
Chouf District
Fratricides
 
Mass shootings in Lebanon
Stabbing attacks in 2020
Stabbing attacks in Asia
Honor killing in Asia
Uxoricides